Chainsukh Madanlal Sancheti (born 16 December 1953) is a veteran politician of the Bhartiya Janata Party in Maharashtra, Consecutively elected for five times as Legislator from Malkapur Assembly Constituency Since 1995. He was  Chairman of dissolved Vidharbha Development Board.

Early life and education

Chainsukh Madanlal Sancheti was born to Shri. Madanlal Sancheti and Smt. Madanbai Sancheti on 16 December 1953. His father and his uncle were devoted members of the Jan Sangh, ‘Swayamsevaks’ of the RSS, and amongst the founding members of the Bhartiya Janata Party. His uncle, Shri. Kisanlal Sancheti, was also a Member of Legislative Assembly from Malkapur.

Sancheti completed his primary schooling at Aadarsh Vidyalaya, Malkapur, and earned a Bachelor of Science (Bsc) from Dhanwate College, Nagpur. Later he secured his Master of Science (MSc.) in Organic Chemistry from the Institute of Science, Nagpur.

Sancheti was also conferred with "Mr. University" title by Nagpur University in 1977.

Political career
Sancheti began his political career in the early seventies as student leader with the Akhil Bhartiya Vidyarthi Parishad (ABVP). In 1976 he was elected as President of the student council of Shri. Shivaji Education Society's Science College, Dhantoli, Nagpur. In 1978 sancheti was appointed as secretary of Janata Yuva Morcha, Maharashtra (Earlier in Janata Party Before formation of BJP). In 1980 was appointed as Secretary of the Bharatiya Janata Yuva Morcha , Maharashtra State.

Sancheti kept rising through the ranks in the party and mainstream politics in 1984 sancheti was appointed as Secretary, BJP, Maharashtra. In 1989 appointed as General Secretary, BJP, Buldhana District, Maharashtra. Sancheti has also worked as Secretary, General Secretary and Vice President, BJP, Maharashtra.

Sancheti's Legislative career began in 1990 when he was first elected as a municipal council corporator from malkapur. Later was elected as leader of opposition of the malkapur municipal council 1990-1994. Since 1995 Sancheti has been consecutively elected as Member of Legislative Assembly, Maharashtra from Malkapur Assembly Constituency. In 2019 assembly elections Sancheti's Winning Legislative career run was cut by voters and people elected a young fresher Rajesh Panditrao Ekade of Indian National Congress.

References

External links
Chainsukh Sancheti Introduction

Maharashtra MLAs 2014–2019
Maharashtra MLAs 1995–1999
Maharashtra MLAs 1999–2004
Maharashtra MLAs 2004–2009
People from Buldhana district
Living people
1953 births